Cláudia Swan de Freitas (born 3 October 1974) is a Brazilian sailor. She competed in the women's 470 event at the 1992 Summer Olympics. She's married to Clinio Freitas and the aunt of Isabel Swan, both Olympic medallists in sailing.

References

External links
 

1974 births
Living people
Brazilian female sailors (sport)
Olympic sailors of Brazil
Sailors at the 1992 Summer Olympics – 470
Sportspeople from Niterói